The Karate competition at the 2009 Asian Martial Arts Games took place from 6 August to 8 August at the Indoor Stadium Huamark. Kumite contested in six weight classes for men and four for women.

Medalists

Men

Women

Medal table

Results

Men

55 kg
6 August

60 kg
6 August

67 kg
7 August

75 kg
7 August

84 kg
8 August

+84 kg
8 August

Women

50 kg
6 August

55 kg
7 August

61 kg
8 August

+61 kg
7 August

References
 Official website – Karate

2009 Asian Martial Arts Games events
Asian Martial Arts Games
Asian Martial Arts Games